Mohabbat Tumse Nafrat Hai ("Love, I hate you") is a Pakistani romantic drama serial that aired on GEO TV. Written by Khalil-ur-Rehman Qamar, produced by 7th Sky Entertainment and directed by Farooq Rind, it stars Ayeza Khan, Imran Abbas and Shehzad Sheikh in the lead roles. The show premiered on 8 April 2017.

Plot
The serial starts with the story of Kaneez Begum's family. She has suffered a lot in her life and witnessed death of many kinfolk. Despite losing all the attractiveness of world, she has created the high-spirited environment in her house and cherishes every remaining moment of life. Maheen (Ayeza Khan), the maternal granddaughter of Kaneez Begum, is kind of short-tempered and egotistical, but still the apple of everyone's eye in the family. Waqar (Imran Abbas), a grandson of Kaneez Begum returns from London and takes interest in Maheen. Although they both were hiding their feelings, Kaneez Begum gets the temperature of their love affair, which is against her wish. She wants to tie the knot between Maheen and Gulraiz (Shehzad Sheikh) so she announces their engagement.

Gulraiz is shy, spineless and introverted although he loves Maheen deep down inside. Maheen's sister Fajar interrupts the matriarch order and convinces Waqar and Maheen to openly claim their love interest. When Gulraiz finds out about Maheen's real feelings, he decided to sacrifice himself for that relationship. It seems like when life is going on the right track as per Maheen's wish, fate has something else in store for her. The fire of jealousy, grudges and hate turns their love into flaming ashes. On their wedding day, Waqar finds and reads Maheen's diary, causing him to leave her; which forces Gulraiz to marry her.

After 8 long years away in Paris, Waqar returns to Pakistan and the truth is unveiled by the girl who turned Maheen and Waqar lives upside down. Gulraiz, it is revealed, died years before of a blood cancer. Waqar is shattered as he now knows that everything was a misunderstanding created by Maheen's friend who had changed Waqar's name to Gulraiz in Maheen's diary with the help of a handwriting expert .After this Waqar somehow manages to convince Maheen for marrying him. Both of them get married, however on the wedding night, she consumes poison while having flashbacks of her wedding with Gulraiz.

The truth is revealed in a letter Maheen leaves. She told Waqar Ahmed she would kill him, leaving him in Hell.

In Maheen's letter, she asks why he never felt shame when he read "her" diary nor when he abandoned her. She also asks how he couldn't see the love she felt for him, even when begging him to not leave the first time. This fulfils her wish to let Waqar know the depth of despair she felt in his lack of trust and his betrayal; leaving him behind to know she felt he didn't deserve her, or anyone else's, love and had to witness maheen the love of his life's death

Cast 
 Ayeza Khan as Maheen Aurangzeb 
 Imran Abbas as Waqar Ahmad
 Shehzad Sheikh as Gulraiz Akhtar
 Saba Faisal as Kaneez Begum (Nanu/Dado)
 Kinza Hashmi as Fajar Aurangzeb
 Haroon Kadwani as Ali Ahmad
 Faryal Mehmood as Jiya (Villain)
 Saman Ansari as Mehrunnisa
 Farhan Ali Agha as Mansoor Ahmed
 Beena Chaudhary as Surayya
 Sabreen Hisbani as Neelam
 Khalid Malik as Wali Ahmed
 Manzoor Qureshi as Nawaz Mehtab Baig
 Malik Raza as Dastoor Ahmad 
 Khuwajah Saleem as Munshi Alam
 Saife Hassan as Aurangzeb (cameo)

Soundtrack

The title song was sung by Rahat Fateh Ali Khan. The music was composed by Sahir Ali Bagga and the lyrics were written by Khalil-ur-Rehman Qamar. The original soundtrack has more than 12 million views on YouTube.

Production 
Sajal Aly was first approached for the role of Maheen. The official poster of the show had also been released featuring Sajal but later she gave up the project due to the ongoing shooting of her upcoming Bollywood debut film, Mom and for the promotion of currently released Pakistani movie, Zindagi Kitni Haseen Hay. Later Ayeza Khan was selected to portray the lead character.

First and second teasers of the show were released on 10 March 2017.

References

External links 
 https://m.imdb.com/title/tt7808964/
 
 
 Imran Abbas @ Instagram|https://www.instagram.com/imranabbas.official/
 Ayeza khan@ Instagram|https://www.instagram.com/ayezakhan.ak/

Pakistani drama television series
2017 Pakistani television series debuts
Urdu-language television shows
7th Sky Entertainment
Geo TV original programming
2017 Pakistani television series endings